Lake City Community School is a school in Lake City, Hinsdale County, Colorado, United States. It provides Pre-K to 12th grade education for approximately 100 students.  It is part of the Hinsdale County School District, and is the only school in RE-1.

This school hosts soccer games against Gunnison and Crested Butte. U-12 and U13 soccer teams consist only of Pre-K through 7th grade.

The school hosts ACT and CSAP tests. It also offers Advanced Placement Program classes.

Public high schools in Colorado
Schools in Hinsdale County, Colorado
Public elementary schools in Colorado
Public middle schools in Colorado